The 5th Metro Manila Film Festival was held in 1979. 

Ten movies vied for top honors in the 1979 Metro Manila Film Festival. HPS Productions' Kasal-Kasalan, Bahay-Bahayan was named Best Film and was the top grosser of the festival. Ina Ka ng Anak Mo received three major awards including the Best Actor and Best Actress for Raul Aragon, and Lolita Rodriguez and Nora Aunor respectively.

Entries

Winners and nominees

Awards
Winners are listed first and highlighted in boldface.

Multiple awards

References

External links

Metro Manila Film Festival
MMFF
MMFF